Pop American Style is a double disc indie pop compilation album, released in 1996 by March Records and subtitled, "40 Original Artists, 40 Original Hits". The label said that "the idea behind the project was to show off most of the deserving acts who created music from their bedrooms, dormrooms, and garages." A follow-up album, Moshi Moshi: Pop International Style, followed in 1999.

Critical reception
AllMusic's Stephen Cramer said it "set the benchmark for indie pop and twee pop compilations" and that it "began a trend of independently released pop in the late '90s." AllMusic's Tim Sendra made it a staff pick, saying that "Not all of [the songs] are hits, but enough are that the combined slugging percentage is hall of fame worthy." When the album was released, CMJ New Music Monthly said it featured "40 bands of the wimpier ilk (this is a description, not an insult) from all over America."

Track listing

References

External links

1996 compilation albums
Indie pop albums by American artists
Indie pop compilation albums